In geometry, the circumscribed circle or circumcircle of a polygon is a circle that passes through all the vertices of the polygon. The center of this circle is called the circumcenter and its radius is called the circumradius.

Not every polygon has a circumscribed circle. A polygon that does have one is called a cyclic polygon, or sometimes a concyclic polygon because its vertices are concyclic. All triangles, all regular simple polygons, all rectangles, all isosceles trapezoids, and all right kites are cyclic.

A related notion is the one of a minimum bounding circle, which is the smallest circle that completely contains the polygon within it, if the circle's center is within the polygon. Every polygon has a unique minimum bounding circle, which may be constructed by a linear time algorithm. Even if a polygon has a circumscribed circle, it may be different from its minimum bounding circle. For example, for an obtuse triangle, the minimum bounding circle has the longest side as diameter and does not pass through the opposite vertex.

Triangles

All triangles are cyclic; that is, every triangle has a circumscribed circle.

Straightedge and compass construction

The circumcenter of a triangle can be constructed by drawing any two of the three perpendicular bisectors. For three non-collinear points, these two lines cannot be parallel, and the circumcenter is the point where they cross. Any point on the bisector is equidistant from the two points that it bisects, from which it follows that this point, on both bisectors, is equidistant from all three triangle vertices.
The circumradius is the distance from it to any of the three vertices.

Alternative construction

An alternative method to determine the circumcenter is to draw any two lines each one departing from one of the vertices at an angle with the common side, the common angle of departure being 90° minus the angle of the opposite vertex. (In the case of the opposite angle being obtuse, drawing a line at a negative angle means going outside the triangle.)

In coastal navigation, a triangle's circumcircle is sometimes used as a way of obtaining a position line using a sextant when no compass is available. The horizontal angle between two landmarks defines the circumcircle upon which the observer lies.

Circumcircle equations

Cartesian coordinates
In the Euclidean plane, it is possible to give explicitly an equation of the circumcircle in terms of the Cartesian coordinates of the vertices of the inscribed triangle. Suppose that

are the coordinates of points . The circumcircle is then the locus of points  in the Cartesian plane satisfying the equations

guaranteeing that the points  are all the same distance  from the common center  of the circle. Using the polarization identity, these equations reduce to the condition that the matrix

has a nonzero kernel. Thus the circumcircle may alternatively be described as the locus of zeros of the determinant of this matrix:

Using cofactor expansion, let

Parametric equation
A unit vector perpendicular to the plane containing the circle is given by
 

Trilinear and barycentric coordinates

An equation for the circumcircle in trilinear coordinates  is  An equation for the circumcircle in barycentric coordinates  is 

Higher dimensions
Additionally, the circumcircle of a triangle embedded in  dimensions can be found using a generalized method.  Let  be -dimensional points, which form the vertices of a triangle. We start by transposing the system to place  at the origin: 

The circumradius  is then

The circumcenter, is given by

This formula only works in three dimensions as the cross product is not defined in other dimensions, but it can be generalized to the other dimensions by replacing the cross products with following identities:

Circumcenter coordinates

Cartesian coordinates
The Cartesian coordinates of the circumcenter  are 

with  

Without loss of generality this can be expressed in a simplified form after translation of the vertex  to the origin of the Cartesian coordinate systems, i.e., when  In this case, the coordinates of the vertices  and  represent the vectors from vertex  to these vertices. Observe that this trivial translation is possible for all triangles and the circumcenter  of the triangle  follow as

with  

Due to the translation of vertex  to the origin, the circumradius  can be computed as

and the actual circumcenter of  follows as

Trilinear coordinates

The circumcenter has trilinear coordinates

where  are the angles of the triangle.

In terms of the side lengths , the trilinears are

Barycentric coordinates
The circumcenter has barycentric coordinates

where  are edge lengths  respectively) of the triangle.

In terms of the triangle's angles , the barycentric coordinates of the circumcenter are

Circumcenter vector

Since the Cartesian coordinates of any point are a weighted average of those of the vertices, with the weights being the point's barycentric coordinates normalized to sum to unity, the circumcenter vector can be written as

The divisor here equals  where  is the area of the triangle. As stated previously

Cartesian coordinates from cross- and dot-products
In Euclidean space, there is a unique circle passing through any given three non-collinear points . Using Cartesian coordinates to represent these points as spatial vectors, it is possible to use the dot product and cross product to calculate the radius and center of the circle. Let

Then the radius of the circle is given by

The center of the circle is given by the linear combination

where

Location relative to the triangle

The circumcenter's position depends on the type of triangle:
For an acute triangle (all angles smaller than a right angle), the circumcenter always lies inside the triangle.
For a right triangle, the circumcenter always lies at the midpoint of the hypotenuse. This is one form of Thales' theorem.
For an obtuse triangle (a triangle with one angle bigger than a right angle), the circumcenter always lies outside the triangle.

These locational features can be seen by considering the trilinear or barycentric coordinates given above for the circumcenter: all three coordinates are positive for any interior point, at least one coordinate is negative for any exterior point, and one coordinate is zero and two are positive for a non-vertex point on a side of the triangle.

Angles

The angles which the circumscribed circle forms with the sides of the triangle coincide with angles at which sides meet each other. The side opposite angle  meets the circle twice: once at each end; in each case at angle  (similarly for the other two angles). This is due to the alternate segment theorem, which states that the angle between the tangent and chord equals the angle in the alternate segment.

Triangle centers on the circumcircle of triangle ABC
In this section, the vertex angles are labeled  and all coordinates are trilinear coordinates:
Steiner point: the nonvertex point of intersection of the circumcircle with the Steiner ellipse. 

(The Steiner ellipse, with center = centroid, is the ellipse of least area that passes through . An equation for this ellipse is 
Tarry point: antipode of the Steiner point

Focus of the Kiepert parabola:

Other properties

The diameter of the circumcircle, called the circumdiameter and equal to twice the circumradius, can be computed as the length of any side of the triangle divided by the sine of the opposite angle: 

As a consequence of the law of sines, it does not matter which side and opposite angle are taken: the result will be the same.

The diameter of the circumcircle can also be expressed as

Trigonometric expressions for the diameter of the circumcircle include

The triangle's nine-point circle has half the diameter of the circumcircle.

In any given triangle, the circumcenter is always collinear with the centroid and orthocenter. The line that passes through all of them is known as the Euler line.

The isogonal conjugate of the circumcenter is the orthocenter.

The useful minimum bounding circle of three points is defined either by the circumcircle (where three points are on the minimum bounding circle) or by the two points of the longest side of the triangle (where the two points define a diameter of the circle). It is common to confuse the minimum bounding circle with the circumcircle.

The circumcircle of three collinear points is the line on which the three points lie, often referred to as a circle of infinite radius. Nearly collinear points often lead to numerical instability in computation of the circumcircle.

Circumcircles of triangles have an intimate relationship with the Delaunay triangulation of a set of points.

By Euler's theorem in geometry, the distance between the circumcenter  and the incenter  is

For centroid  and nine-point center  we have

The product of the incircle radius and the circumcircle radius of a triangle with sides  is

With circumradius , sides , and medians , we have

If median , altitude , and internal bisector  all emanate from the same vertex of a triangle with circumradius , then

Carnot's theorem states that the sum of the distances from the circumcenter to the three sides equals the sum of the circumradius and the inradius. Here a segment's length is considered to be negative if and only if the segment lies entirely outside the triangle.

If a triangle has two particular circles as its circumcircle and incircle, there exist an infinite number of other triangles with the same circumcircle and incircle, with any point on the circumcircle as a vertex. (This is the  case of Poncelet's porism). A necessary and sufficient condition for such triangles to exist is the above equality

Cyclic quadrilaterals

Quadrilaterals that can be circumscribed have particular properties including the fact that opposite angles are supplementary angles (adding up to 180° or π radians).

Cyclic n-gons

For a cyclic polygon with an odd number of sides, all angles are equal if and only if the polygon is regular. A cyclic polygon with an even number of sides has all angles equal if and only if the alternate sides are equal (that is, sides  are equal, and sides  are equal).

A cyclic pentagon with rational sides and area is known as a Robbins pentagon; in all known cases, its diagonals also have rational lengths.

In any cyclic -gon with even , the sum of one set of alternate angles (the first, third, fifth, etc.) equals the sum of the other set of alternate angles. This can be proven by induction from the  case, in each case replacing a side with three more sides and noting that these three new sides together with the old side form a quadrilateral which itself has this property; the alternate angles of the latter quadrilateral represent the additions to the alternate angle sums of the previous -gon.

Let one -gon be inscribed in a circle, and let another -gon be tangential to that circle at the vertices of the first -gon.

Point on the circumcircle

Let a cyclic -gon have vertices  on the unit circle.

For a regular -gon, if  are the distances from any point  on the circumcircle to the vertices , then

Polygon circumscribing constant

Any regular polygon is cyclic. Consider a unit circle, then circumscribe a regular triangle such that each side touches the circle. Circumscribe a circle, then circumscribe a square. Again circumscribe a circle, then circumscribe a regular pentagon, and so on. The radii of the circumscribed circles converge to the so-called polygon circumscribing constant

. The reciprocal of this constant is the Kepler–Bouwkamp constant.

See also
Circumcenter of mass
Circumgon
Circumscribed sphere
Circumcevian triangle
Inscribed circle
Japanese theorem for cyclic polygons
Japanese theorem for cyclic quadrilaterals
Jung's theorem, an inequality relating the diameter of a point set to the radius of its minimum bounding sphere
Kosnita theorem
Lester's theorem
Tangential polygon
Triangle center

References

External links
Derivation of formula for radius of circumcircle of triangle at Mathalino.com
 Semi-regular angle-gons and side-gons: respective generalizations of rectangles and rhombi at Dynamic Geometry Sketches, interactive dynamic geometry sketch.

MathWorld

Interactive
Triangle circumcircle and circumcenter With interactive animation
An interactive Java applet for the circumcenter

Circles defined for a triangle
Compass and straightedge constructions